Mystery Room may referrer to:

The Layton Brothers: Mystery Room
The Mystery Room in the Sears-Kay Ruin Fort.  - Sears-Kay Ruin is one of the many forts built by the Hohokam 
The Mystery Room in the Arizona Biltmore Hotel - An illegal Prohibition era (1920 to 1933) speakeasy disguised as a cigar smoking room.